The Merino Muster is a cross-country skiing marathon in the South Island of New Zealand. It has been held since 1995 and is part of Worldloppet since 2014.

References

External links
Official website

1995 establishments in New Zealand
August sporting events
Recurring sporting events established in 1995
Ski marathons
Skiing in New Zealand
Wānaka
Sports competitions in New Zealand
Winter events in New Zealand